A list of American films released in 1903.

See also
 1903 in the United States

References

External links

1903 films at the Internet Movie Database

1903
Films
American
1900s in American cinema